The Argonaute was a 74-gun ship of the line of the French Navy, lead ship of her class.

Career 
Argonaute served in Suffren's campaign in the Indian Ocean, taking part in the Battle of Cuddalore   under Chevalier de Clavières. 

In 1794, she was razéed and renamed to Flibustier, recommissioned as a 42-gun frigate. 

She was decommissioned in December 1795.

Notes, citations, and references

Notes

Citations

References
 

Ships of the line of the French Navy
Argonaute-class ships of the line
1781 ships